Cardiospermum is a genus of approximately 14 species in the soapberry family, Sapindaceae, which are native to the American, Indian, and African tropics. The genus name is derived from the Greek words καρδία, meaning "heart," and σπέρμα, meaning "seed." Common names of the members of this genus include balloon vine, love in a puff, heartseed, and heartseed vine. These plants are classified as invasive species in parts of the Southern United States and South Africa.

Uses
The genus Cardiospermum consists primarily of herbaceous vines, which are cultivated in warm regions as ornamental plants. Extractions of Cardiospermum seed are included in skin creams that claim to treat eczema and other skin conditions.

Species
Species include:
Cardiospermum corindum
Cardiospermum dissectum
Cardiospermum grandiflorum
Cardiospermum halicacabum

References

External links
Cardiospermum grandiflorum at Pacific Island Ecosystems at Risk (PIER)
New active discovered in Cardiospermum extract could be more effective than steroids

Sapindaceae
Sapindaceae genera